Kun valaistun (When I Become Enlightened) is the third studio album by Finnish pop singer-songwriter Chisu. It was released by Warner Music in Finland on 5 October 2011 and it debuted at number one on the Finnish Albums Chart.

Track listing
Digital download

Charts and certifications

Weekly charts

Year-end charts

Certifications

Kun valaistun 2.0

The album was rereleased on 6 June 2012 with 12 tracks, comprising the original 9 tracks of the 2011 album and addition of three more tracks, namely "Frankenstein", "Kolmas pyörä" and "Kun valaistun".

Track list
"Minä ja mun pää"
"Sabotage"
"Kohtalon oma"
"Ennustus"
"Tie"
"Veneretki"
"Kriisit"
"Jos on valmis, ei sitä tartte kysyykään"
"Vanha jo nuorena"
"Frankenstein"
"Kolmas pyörä"
"Kun valaistun"

See also
List of number-one albums of 2011 (Finland)

References

2011 albums
Chisu albums